Shilo is an  Israeli settlement in the northern West Bank. Located 28 miles (45 km) north of Jerusalem on Route 60 and organised as a religious community settlement, it is neighboured by the Israeli settlements of Eli and Maale Levona and the Palestinian villages Sinjil, Turmus Ayya and Qaryut, and falls under the jurisdiction of Mateh Binyamin Regional Council.

The international community considers Israeli settlements in the West Bank illegal under international law, but the Israeli government disputes this.

Location

The city of Shilo held a central place in the Biblical history of the Jewish people. During the period between capturing the Land and building the Temple, in the days when Joshua divided the land among the 12 tribes, the Tabernacle resided in Shilo. Until the death of Eli the High Priest, Shilo was the place of pilgrimage for the Children of Israel. Three times a year the faithful traveled to Shilo to bring their festival offerings.

Tel Shilo is now an archaeological site, where once the spiritual life of the Jewish people was centered for 369 years in the 11th and 12th centuries BCE. In addition, there are artifacts from other periods, notably from the end of the Second Temple period (130 B.C.E. – 70 B.C.E.), the Byzantine period (350–618), and the early Muslim period (638–900).

The first archaeological excavations began in 1922–1932 by a Danish expedition. The finds were placed in the Danish National Museum in Copenhagen. In 1980, Israel Finkelstein, an archaeologist from Bar-Ilan University, initiated four seasons of digs and many finds were revealed including coins, storage jars, and other artifacts. Many are preserved at Bar-Ilan University. In 1981–1982, Zeev Yeivin and Rabbi Yoel Bin-Nun excavated at the presumed site of the tabernacle. Ceramics and Egyptian figurines were found.

In the summer of 2010, excavations at Tel Shilo were carried out under the auspices of the Staff Officer for Archeology in the Civilian Administration Antiquities Unit in cooperation with the Mateh Binyamin Regional Council.  A portion of the Canaanite period wall from 3700 years ago was uncovered in an attempt to ascertain if this was the first evidence of civilization.  One notable find, not far from the wall, was a Roman coin from the period of the Bar Kokhba revolt.

A second season of excavation revealed a large structure, perhaps of an administrative character, originating in the Byzantine period (4th–7th centuries) but built on a Roman period floor. An olive press was subsequently uncovered during a cleaning up.

History
According to ARIJ, in order to construct Shilo, Israel confiscated land from two neighbouring Palestinian villages/towns:
752 dunams from Turmus Ayya,
635 dunams from Qaryut.

According to the Gush Emunim movement, Shilo was considered a potential site for a settlement as early as 1974. In January 1978, a modern community was established adjacent to the ancient biblical site, Tel Shilo. In 1979, Shilo was officially included in the list of settlements under the Jurisdiction of the Settlement Section of the Jewish Agency. The village is administrated by the Mateh Binyamin Regional Council.

The ownership of the land that makes up Shilo is disputed. Settlers and the Israeli government claim that the settlement is built entirely on state land, owned by the state in 1967 or reverted to it because the owners had fled. Peace Now and local Palestinians claim that more than a quarter of Shilo is built on land privately owned by Palestinians. Shilo was cited by Oslo Peace Accords negotiator Yossi Beilin as an example of an area that should be transferred to Palestinian control due to its location in a densely populated Palestinian area."

On 27 November 2011, the Israeli Defense Ministry approved two plans which would see 119 new housing units built in Shilo, which would expand the settlement by 60%. The approval came as a response to a petition by Peace Now to the Israeli Supreme Court filed eight months before after construction began on 40 new housing units.

In February 2012 the Israeli government approved the construction of new housing units in Shilo.  The approval of new and existing construction was condemned by the High Representative of the Union for Foreign Affairs and Security Policy of the European Union, Catherine Ashton, as a "provocative action" contrary to international law and Israel's obligations under the Quartet Roadmap, which states that "Israel should not only freeze all settlement activity, but also dismantle those settlements erected since March 2001."

On 7 April 2015 a 32-year-old Palestinian man stabbed two Israeli army paramedics, one of whom was seriously injured. He was shot dead at the entrance to the settlement after his attack.

Yeshivat Hesder Shilo

Yeshivat Hesder Shilo was founded in 1979 and has over 100 students including 25 Kollel members. As a hesder yeshiva, the students of Shilo combine intensive studies with service in the IDF. 

The Rosh Yeshiva is Rabbi Aviv Gamliel, while Rabbi Michael Brom, founding Rosh Yeshiva, serves as president; Rosh Kollel is Rabbi Gavriel Gabbai. Rabbi Aharon (Arele) Harel served as co-Rosh Yeshiva for five years before resigning from this position prior to the start of 5771 (October 2010).

Like other Yeshivot, the Yeshiva emphasizes intellectual Torah study centred on Talmud and Halacha. It is, however, atypical in its parallel focus on emunah, internalization and character development, where there are formal study sessions focusing on both Musar literature and Chassidut as part of the daily program.

After completing the five-year program, some students opt to further their rabbinic studies in the kollel and pursue semicha from the Chief Rabbinate of Israel. Students may also certify as teachers with an academic degree (B.Ed.) in the Lifshitz College of Education, with which the yeshiva is affiliated. Many students and teaching staff choose to settle in Shilo permanently.

Midreshet Binat in Shvut Rachel, a midrasha headed by Rabbi Ronen Tamir, was established in 2000 as a branch of the yeshiva.

Tabernacle synagogue

The town's main synagogue is designed as a replica of the Biblical Tabernacle. It contains replicas and tributes to many of the utensils in the original Tabernacle of Shilo.

International law
The international community considers Israeli settlements to violate the Fourth Geneva Convention's prohibition on the deportation or transfer of parts of an occupying power's own civilian population into occupied territory except in those cases in which the security of the  population or imperative military reasons so demand. Israel disputes that the Fourth Geneva Convention applies as the Palestinian territories had not been legally held by a sovereign prior to Israel capturing them. This views have been opposed by the International Committee of the Red Cross and the International Court of Justice.

Notable residents
 Rabbi Nissan Ben-Avraham

See also
Population statistics for Israeli settlements in the West Bank

References

External links

 
 Shilo at the Binyamin Regional Council
 Shilo at the Jewish Virtual Library

1978 establishments in the Israeli Military Governorate
Community settlements
Mateh Binyamin Regional Council
Populated places established in 1978
Religious Israeli settlements
Israeli settlements in the West Bank